Big Bam Boom is the twelfth studio album by American duo Daryl Hall & John Oates, released by RCA Records on October 12, 1984. It marked the end of one of the most successful album runs by a duo of the 1980s. RCA issued a remastered version in July 2004 with four bonus tracks. The lead single "Out of Touch" was a #1 pop hit, and charted in several other areas (#24 Hot Black Singles, #8 on the Adult Contemporary charts and #1 on the dance charts, #48 in the UK). Another song taken from the album, the Daryl Hall and Janna Allen-penned "Method of Modern Love" reached a high point of #5, and "Some Things Are Better Left Unsaid," reached #18.

Musical styles on the album include pop, rock, and dance-rock, with R&B/soul influences. The album has even more of an electronic, urban feel to it compared to their previous albums, combining their song structure and vocalization with the latest technical advances in recording and playing. The album employed some of the most sophisticated equipment ever used in the recording industry at the time.

Big Bam Boom peaked at No. 5 in the United States and sold over three million copies worldwide.

Background and recording
The making of Big Bam Boom involved a mixture of traditional recordings and state of the art technologies.

The duo opted to record on analog tape rather than the then-new digital multitrack machines, and due to their commercial success the duo was able to take advantage of the latest musical devices available then, specially the most advanced polyphonic synthesizers like Synclavier and the Fairlight.

Bob Clearmountain, one of the producers, and Mickey Curry, the drummer, recorded various drum sounds, manipulating delays and reverbs to create huge dramatic bottom end that is emblematic of this album and the 1980s in general.

Thanks to the new polyphonic synthesizers, the duo experimented with new sounds, for example, recording Boy Scout canteens, cardboard boxes, vocals, footsteps in gravel, etc., and combined them with the use of newer and more sophisticated drum machines.

Promotion
In order to promote the album, the duo embarked the Big Bam Boom Tour – Live Through '85; they did most of the traveling in a private plane. MTV provided tour date and ticket outlet announcements and the channel's name appeared on all tickets and print advertising, and was tagged on all radio spots. The duo performed a show at The Forum in Inglewood, California, on December 17, 1984, with a satellite-delivered live broadcast of the concert; it was aired the next day. The radio broadcast was remastered and released on CD, via music download and streaming in 2015 under the title: The LA Forum – 17 Dec 1984.

Critical reception

In a review for AllMusic, Stephen Thomas Erlewine called Big Bam Boom "a sprawling and diffuse album" and "a bigger, noisier record than its predecessors, with its rhythms smacking around in an echo chamber and each track built on layers of synthesizers and studio effects". In Erlewine's opinion, it was a disappointment coming after a trio of albums that had very few flaws. Erlewine also criticized the production on the album saying that "it obscures the dark undercurrent to many of the tunes, several of which seem to foreshadow the duo's long hiatus following this record".

Track listing

Personnel 
 Daryl Hall – lead vocals (2–6, 8), backing vocals, synthesizers, guitars, arrangements
 John Oates – lead vocals (7, 9), backing vocals, synthesizers, guitars, synth guitar, arrangements
 Robbie Kilgore – keyboards, synthesizer programming
 Wells Christy – Synclavier programming
 Clive Smith – Fairlight CMI
 Tom "T-Bone" Wolk – synthesizers, guitars, bass, arrangements
 G.E. Smith – lead guitars
 Mickey Curry – drums
 Jimmy Bralower – LinnDrum programming
 Bashiri Johnson – percussion, timbales
 Jay Burnett – additional percussion
 Charles DeChant – saxophone
 Coati Mundi – Spanish vocals

Production 
 Producers – Daryl Hall, John Oates and Bob Clearmountain.
 Engineers – Jay Burnett and Bob Clearmountain
 Assistant Engineers – Gary Hellman, Bruce Buchalter and Michael Sauvage.
 Mixed by Bob Clearmountain
 "Mix Consultant and Additional Production"; also remixing on Tracks #10–13 – Arthur Baker
 Editing on Tracks #10–13 – The Latin Rascals
 Mastered by Bob Ludwig at Masterdisk (New York, NY).
 Keyboard Technician – Mike Klvana 
 Keyboard and Synth Drum Technician – Anthony Aquilato 
 Art Direction and Artwork – Mick Haggerty
 Cover Photography – Jean Pagliuso
 Inner Photography – Jean Pagliuso and Larry Williams
 Management and Direction – Tommy Mottola
 Director of Security – Eddie Anderson

Charts and certifications
The album debuted at number 33 on the Billboard 200 the week of October 27, 1984 as the highest debut of the week. After five weeks it peaked at number five on the chart on December 1, 1984. The album remained on the chart for 51 weeks and was ranked as the 17th most successful album of 1985 on the Billboard 200. Additionally, it reached number 25 on the Top R&B/Hip-Hop Albums chart the week of January 12, 1985. 

By December 1984, the album had sold one million copies in the US, and was certified Platinum on December 3, 1984.  Eventually, it sold an additional one million copies, and was certified double Platinum by the RIAA on April 1, 1985.

In the United Kingdom the album debuted and peaked at number 28 on October 28, 1984 and was present on the chart for 13 weeks. It was certified Silver by the BPI on February 1, 1985 for shipments of 60,000.

Weekly charts

Year-end charts

Certifications

References

Bibliography

 

1984 albums
Hall & Oates albums
Albums produced by Bob Clearmountain
RCA Records albums
Dance-rock albums